The Battle of the Acul took place on 19 February 1794 during the Haitian Revolution.

Battle 
Following an attempted push back to Port-de-Paix, British General John Whitelocke decides to attack the Fortress of Acul, located a league from the town of Léogâne. The 13th, 20th, 49th and 62nd British regiments, composed of European soldiers, land in this city and then march the fort. The latter was stormed after a three-hour battle during which Baron de Montalembert, Colonel Spencer, Captain Vincent, the elite companies of the 49th and the light infantry of the Royal Guards and 49th. A young black Republican, however, fires in the powder keg of the fort which causes an explosion that kills 60 English soldiers.

Notes

Bibliography 
 

Conflicts in 1794
Acul
Acul
Acul
Haitian Revolution
1794 in France
1794 in North America